Warryn Stafford Campbell, Jr. (born August 21, 1975) is an American record producer. He has worked with a number of gospel, hip hop and R&B artists. Campbell originally got his start as a session musician and producer under the tutelage of DJ Quik on his third album Safe + Sound.

Career
His work includes production and songwriting credits for Mary Mary, Kanye West, Alicia Keys, Xzibit, Yolanda Adams, Mos Def, Missy Elliott, Kierra Sheard, Brandy, Dave Hollister, Men of Standard, Mario, Kelly Price, Shanice, Dru Hill, Dorinda Clark-Cole, Musiq Soulchild and more. He is also a member of the modern quartet-styled traditional gospel group The Soul Seekers signed to GospoCentric Records. As a record executive, he served as vice president of A&R for Elektra Records briefly.

He appears in the 2019 movie Strive as "The Pastor" as well as composing the music for the film.

Personal life
On May 26, 2001, he married Erica Atkins of the gospel/R&B duo Mary Mary. They have a daughter, Krista Nicole Campbell, born September 13, 2004. On April 24, 2010, the couple's second child, Warryn Campbell III was born. On July 19, 2011, Erica announced on Good Morning America that she was pregnant with their third child. She gave birth early to a girl, Zaya Monique Campbell, on January 24, 2012.

Campbell was diagnosed with kidney cancer in 2008 and had an emergency operation to remove one kidney.

Awards and nominations

Grammy Awards
The Grammy Awards are awarded annually by the National Academy of Recording Arts and Sciences.

|-
||2000
||Mountain High... Valley Low (Yolanda Adams's album) (as producer)
|rowspan="2"|Best Contemporary R&B Gospel Album
|
|-
||2001
||Thankful (Mary Mary's album) (as producer)
|
|-
||2002
||Songs in A Minor (Alicia Keys's album) (as producer)
|Best R&B Album
|
|-
||2003
||Full Moon (Brandy's album) (as producer)
|rowspan="3"|Best Contemporary R&B Album
|
|-
|rowspan="2"|2005
||Afrodisiac (Brandy's album) (as producer)
|
|-
||It's About Time (Christina Milian's album) (as producer)
|
|-
|rowspan="6"|2006
|rowspan="2"|Late Registration (Kanye West's album) (as producer)
|Album of the Year
|
|-
|rowspan="2"|Best Rap Album
|
|-
||The Cookbook (Missy Elliott's album) (as producer)
|
|-
||Turning Point (Mario's album) (as producer)
|Best Contemporary R&B Album
|
|-
||Mary Mary (Mary Mary's album) (as producer)
|Best Contemporary R&B Gospel Album
|
|-
||"Heaven" (Mary Mary)
|Best Gospel Song
|
|-
||2007
||Unpredictable (Jamie Foxx's album) (as producer)
|Best R&B Album
|
|-
|rowspan="3"|2008
|rowspan="2"|Graduation (Kanye West's album) (as producer)
|Album of the Year
|
|-
|Best Rap Album
|
|-
||Luvanmusiq (Musiq Soulchild's album) (as producer)
|Best R&B Album
|
|-
|rowspan="4"|2009
||The Sound (Mary Mary's album) (as producer)
|Best Contemporary R&B Gospel Album
|
|-
||Jennifer Hudson (Jennifer Hudson's album) (as producer)
|Best R&B Album
|
|-
|rowspan="2"|"Get Up"
|Best Gospel/Contemporary Christian Music Performance
|
|-
|rowspan="3"|Best Gospel Song
|
|-
||2010
||"God In Me"
|
|-
|rowspan="2"|2013
||"Go Get It"
|
|-
||Write Me Back (R. Kelly's album) (as producer)
|Best R&B Album
|
|-
|rowspan="2"|2018
||"Too Hard Not To" (Tina Campbell song) (as writer)
|Best Gospel Performance/Song
|
|-
||"My Life" (Walls Group Song) (as writer)
|Best Gospel Performance/Song
|
|-
|rowspan="2"|2022
|rowspan="2"|Donda (Kanye West album) (as writer and producer)
|Album of the Year
|
|-
|Best Rap Album
|

References

African-American songwriters
Record producers from California
Songwriters from California
American rhythm and blues musicians
American gospel singers
Grammy Award winners
Living people
1975 births
21st-century African-American male singers
20th-century African-American male singers